Paramphistomum is a genus of parasitic flatworms belonging to the digenetic trematodes. It includes flukes which are mostly parasitising livestock ruminants, as well as some wild mammals. They are responsible for the serious disease called paramphistomiasis, also known as amphistomosis, especially in cattle and sheep. Its symptoms include profuse diarrhoea, anaemia, lethargy, and often result in death if untreated. They are found throughout the world, and most abundantly in livestock farming regions such as Australia, Asia, Africa, Eastern Europe, and Russia.

The generic name was introduced by F. Fischoeder in 1901 for the replacement of the then existing genus Amphistoma (Rudolphi, 1809). Under the new genus he redescribed both Paramphistomum cervi and P. bothriophoron and designated the former as the type species.

Species
Due to striking resemblance with each other and with other amphistomes, a number of described species are known to be synonymous. Some important species are:

Paramphistomum cervi
Paramphistomum cotylophorum
Paramphistomum cracile
Paramphistomum gotoi
Paramphistomum grande
Paramphistomum hiberniae
Paramphistomum ichikawai
Paramphistomum epiclitum
Paramphistomum explanatum
Paramphistomum leydeni
Paramphistomum liorchis
Paramphistomum microbothrioides
Paramphistomum phillerouxi

Description
The generic name (Greek: para meaning "similar" [to Amphistoma], amphi meaning "on both sides", and stoma for "mouth") is given due to the presence of an anterior oral sucker and a posterior larger ventral sucker in adult worms. The body is minute, measuring less than a centimetre. The body is covered with a highly folded tegument, which in turn is provided with sensory papillae. Paramphistomum are all hermaphrodite, having both male and female reproductive systems in the posterior region of the body.

Life cycle
Their life cycle is indirect, requiring a definitive host such as ruminants, an intermediate host such as snail, and a free-living of external phases in water and plants. The sexually mature monoecious self-fertilises in the mammalian rumen, and release the eggs along with faeces. Eggs hatch in water into ciliated miracidia. The miracidia then enters the body of an intermediate host, which are snails belonging to the genera Bulinus, Planorbis, Physa Stagnicola and Pseudosuccinea. Then the miracidia lost their cilia to become sporocysts. After a few days they develop up to 8 rediae, which are rapidly liberated. Each redia contains about 15-30 cercariae. Mature cercariae are possess by two eyespots and a long slender tail, by which they find aquatic plants or other suitable substrata, to which they get attached and encyst to become metacercariae. The mammalian hosts ingest the infective larvae. Once inside the duodenum and jejunum, their cysts are removed. They penetrate the intestinal wall by actively destroying the mucosa, and then migrate to the rumen, where the grow into adult.

Pathogenicity and pathology

Paramphistomiasis causes enteritis and anaemia in livestock mammals and result in substantial production and economic losses. Pathological symptoms are produced by immature flukes. When the young flukes start to gather in the intestine, there is a watery and fetid diarrhoea which is often associated with high mortality (even up to 80-90%) in ruminants. At a given time, as many as 30,000 flukes may accumulate, fervently attacking the duodenal mucosa to induce acute enteritis. Adult flukes are relatively harmless. Liver tissue are generally damaged extensively, indicated by  swelling, haemorrhage, discolouration, necrosis, bile duct hyperplasia, and fibrosis.

Diagnosis and treatment
Symptoms are easily indicated by infected sheep and cattle as they become severely anorexic or inefficiently digest food, and become unthrifty. Fetid diarrhoea is an obvious indication so that fluid faeces are examined for immature flukes.
 
Paramphistomiasis is considered a neglected tropical disease, with no prescription drug for treatment and control. Thus management of infection is based mainly on control of the snail population. Drugs shown to be effective are resorantel, oxyclozanide, clorsulon, ivermectin, niclosamide, bithional and levamisole. An in vitro demonstration shows that plumbagin exhibits high efficacy on adult flukes.

References

External links

Disease information at Merial Sanofi
Medical Definition
Information at VetPDA
Classification at Animal Diversity Web
The Merck Veterinary Manual
Systematic classification
RVC/FAO Guide to Veterinary Diagnostic Parasitology
Preventive Veterinary Medicine, Royal University of Bhutan
Atlas of livestock parasites at Institute of Tropics and Subtropics
Integrated Taxonomic Information System
NCBI Taxonomy
Fauna Europaea
Taxonomy at UniProt
Taxonomy at ZipcodeZoo
Classification at Encyclopedia of Life
Taxonomy at BOLDSYSTEMS

Parasites of mammals
Digenea genera